Abdulrahman Bangura (born 10 January 1986) is a Sierra Leonean footballer. He is a central defender who last played for Atlanta Silverbacks.

Career

Club

Atlanta FC
Bangura played with Atlanta FC in the NPSL from 2008-2010, featuring at all positions on the backline and in defensive midfield.

Härnösands FF
Born in Sierra Leone, Bangura moved to the U.S. as a teenager. He went on to play at the collegiate level at Montreat College, a NAIA school in North Carolina. Bangura spent two full seasons with Swedish club Härnösands FF, and was the only player on the team to appear in every single game from 2011-2013. He was also named to the league’s Best XI, occupying one of its three defensive spots.

Atlanta Silverbacks
Bangura signed a professional contract with the Atlanta Silverbacks on 28 February 2014. He made his debut with the club as a substitute in the 89th minute away against FC Edmonton. The Silverbacks won the game 2-1.

Abdul made his first start with the club on 31 May 2014 against Minnesota United FC. He played the full 90 minutes, however Atlanta lost the game 2-1 at home.

International

Bangura was called up to the Sierra Leone national team for their two fixtures in the 2015 Africa Cup of Nations qualification against Seychelles. He got his first cap and played the first match in Freetown. Sierra Leone won the game 2-0.

Personal life
He is the cousin of Shaka Bangura, his teammate at Atlanta Silverbacks.

References

External links
 

1986 births
Living people
Sierra Leonean footballers
Sierra Leonean expatriate footballers
Atlanta Silverbacks players
Association football defenders
Sierra Leonean expatriate sportspeople in Sweden
Sierra Leonean expatriate sportspeople in the United States
Expatriate soccer players in the United States
North American Soccer League players
Härnösands FF players
Expatriate footballers in Sweden
Montreat Cavaliers men's soccer players
Sportspeople from Freetown